Xue Zong (died 243), courtesy name Jingwen, was a Chinese poet and politician of the state of Eastern Wu during the Three Kingdoms period of China. He was known for his quick wit. On one occasion, when the Shu envoy Zhang Feng made fun of the name of his colleague Kan Ze during a feast, he gained somewhat of a measure of revenge by making fun of Shu's name. He was also known for assisting Lü Dai in the pacification of Jiaozhi Commandery (covering parts of present-day western Guangdong, southwestern Guangxi and northern Vietnam). In 233, when Sun Quan considered an ill-advised campaign to the Liaodong Peninsula against the recalcitrant warlord Gongsun Yuan (who had submitted to him and then betrayed him and killed his envoys), Xue Zong was one of the officials who spoke against the campaign, eventually getting Sun Quan to change his mind. Xue Zong had two sons: Xue Ying and Xue Xu.

See also
 Lists of people of the Three Kingdoms

References

 Chen, Shou (3rd century). Records of the Three Kingdoms (Sanguozhi).
 Pei, Songzhi (5th century). Annotations to Records of the Three Kingdoms (Sanguozhi zhu).

Year of birth unknown
243 deaths
Han dynasty poets
Han dynasty politicians from Anhui
Eastern Wu essayists
Eastern Wu poets
Eastern Wu politicians
Officials under Sun Quan
Poets from Anhui
Political office-holders in Guangdong
Politicians from Suzhou, Anhui